Salix silesiaca, the Silesian willow, is a species of flowering plant in the family Salicaceae. It is native to the Sudeten and Carpathian Mountains, and the mountains of the Balkan Peninsula. A shrub reaching , it is considered to be a member of the informal sallow group.

References

silesiaca
Flora of the Czech Republic
Flora of Poland
Flora of Ukraine
Flora of Romania
Flora of Bulgaria
Flora of Yugoslavia
Plants described in 1806